South St. Paul is a city in Dakota County, Minnesota, United States, immediately south and southeast of St. Paul and east of West St. Paul. The population was 20,759 at the 2020 census. The town was a major meat-packing location, and many residents are descended from immigrants of Southern European and Eastern European heritage, who came to work in the meat-packing plants in the early twentieth century.

A post office called "South St. Paul" has been in operation since 1888. The city was named based on its location, south of St. Paul.

Geography

Interstate Highway 494, U.S. Highway 52, and Dakota County Road 56 are three of the major routes that traverse South St. Paul. It is home to a small general aviation airport, Fleming Field.

Since 2008, the stockyards have been closed, and much of the area is now being redeveloped.

Demographics

2020 census 
As of the 2020 census there were 20,759 people residing in the city. The racial makeup of the city was 81.0% White, 3.2% African American, 0.8% Native American, 2.0% Asian, 0.0% Pacific Islander, and 6.2% from two or more races. Hispanic or Latino people of any race were 14.2% of the population.

24.3% of residents were under the age of 18 and 13.0% were 65 years of age or older. The gender makeup of the city was 50.9% female.

2010 census 
As of the 2010 census, there were 20,160 people, 8,186 households, and 5,065 families residing in the city. The racial makeup of the city was 85.3% White, 3.9% African American, 0.8% Native American, 1.2% Asian, 0.1% Pacific Islander, 5.4% from other races, and 3.4% from two or more races. Hispanic or Latino people of any race were 12.2% of the population.

There were 8,186 households, of which 31.4% had children under the age of 18 living with them, 42.2% were married couples living together, 14.2% had a female householder with no husband present, 5.4% had a male householder with no wife present, and 38.1% were non-families. 30.1% of all households were made up of individuals, and 10.1% had someone living alone who was 65 years of age or older. The average household size was 2.44 and the average family size was 3.04.

The median age in the city was 36.9 years. 23.8% of residents were under the age of 18; 8.4% were between the ages of 18 and 24; 28.8% were from 25 to 44; 27% were from 45 to 64; and 12% were 65 years of age or older. The gender makeup of the city was 49.2% male and 50.8% female.

2000 census

As of the census of 2000, there were 20,167 people, 8,123 households, and 5,255 families residing in the city. The racial makeup of the city was 92.63% White, 1.28% African American, 0.57% Native American, 0.82% Asian, 0.01% Pacific Islander, 2.80% from other races, and 1.90% from two or more races. Hispanic or Latino people of any race were 6.42% of the population.

There were 8,123 households, out of which 32.5% had children under the age of 18 living with them, 47.0% were married couples living together, 13.1% had a female householder with no husband present, and 35.3% were non-families. 28.8% of all households were made up of individuals, and 10.8% had someone living alone who was 65 years of age or older. The average household size was 2.47 and the average family size was 3.05.

In the city, the population was spread out, with 25.4% under the age of 18, 9.0% from 18 to 24, 32.7% from 25 to 44, 20.1% from 45 to 64, and 12.8% who were 65 years of age or older. The median age was 35 years. For every 100 females, there were 95.3 males. For every 100 females age 18 and over, there were 93.1 males.

The median income for a household in the city was $45,216, and the median income for a family was $54,119. Males had a median income of $36,466 versus $28,415 for females. The per capita income for the city was $21,396. About 4.1% of families, and 6.1% of the population were below the poverty line, including 6.8% of those under age 18 and 5.7% of those age 65 or over.

Notable people
 Jim Carter, football player
 Justin Faulk, hockey player
 Trevor Fehrman, actor and writer
 Rollin Glewwe, Minnesota state senator and politician
 Grant Hart, drummer
 Phil Housley, hockey player
 Sunisa Lee, Olympic gold medalist and gymnast 
 Harold LeVander, Governor of Minnesota
 Betty McCollum, politician
 Tim Pawlenty, Governor of Minnesota
 James Patrick Shannon, former Roman Catholic Bishop from the Roman Catholic Archdiocese of Saint Paul and Minneapolis, only Bishop to leave the priesthood after Vatican II
 Alex Stalock, Goaltender for the Minnesota Wild of the National Hockey League
 Conrado Vega, Minnesota state senator
 Doug Woog, hockey player

References

External links
 City of South St. Paul – official website

Cities in Minnesota
Cities in Dakota County, Minnesota
Minnesota populated places on the Mississippi River